The Chobhar Dry Port is a dry port in Kirtipur, Bagmati Province, Nepal.

In January 2019, then prime minister KP Sharma Oli laid the foundation stone for the port.  The dry port spans over 11.77 hectares of land and it is estimated that it will cost 1.70 billion Nepalese rupees (NPR). The Chobhar Dry Port is being built on the land that was previously used by Himal Cement Factory. 

In August 2021, it was reported that the port was ready to begin its operation. The Chobhar Dry Port was initially met with protests by the locals as they believed that the construction of the port will eventually displace them.

References 

Buildings and structures in Kathmandu District
Ports and harbours of Nepal
Transport infrastructure in Nepal